The Driving World Tour was a concert tour by English musician Paul McCartney. It marked his first tour of the 21st century and of any kind since 1993's New World Tour. For the first time in nearly a decade, McCartney returned to the road following the death of first wife, Linda McCartney, the death of George Harrison, and 9/11. This was in promotion of his 2001 album Driving Rain. Paul "Wix" Wickens returned on keyboards and is credited as Musical Director.  New to the fold were Americans Rusty Anderson, Brian Ray, and Abe Laboriel Jr. Paul McCartney's then-fiancée Heather Mills accompanied him on the tour and was in the audience for every American performance.

Background
The tour began on April 1, 2002, when the American leg was kicked off in Oakland, California. The official release chronicling the first U.S. leg of the tour was the CD and DVD Back in the U.S., which itself would be promoted by another leg in the States. The second American leg was followed by visits to Mexico and Japan. A remix of The Fireman tracks and a performance by Cirque du Soleil opened each show.

Tour band 
 Paul McCartney – lead vocals, acoustic, electric and bass guitars, piano, ukulele
 Rusty Anderson – backing vocals, acoustic and electric guitars
 Brian Ray – backing vocals, acoustic, electric and bass guitars
 Paul "Wix" Wickens – backing vocals, keyboards, accordion, acoustic guitar
 Abe Laboriel, Jr. – backing vocals, drums, percussion

Tour dates

Set list

See also 
 List of highest-grossing concert tours

References 

2002 concert tours
Paul McCartney concert tours